Dungeon Party is a 3D massively multiplayer online role-playing game developed by Cyanide Studio. The game was released May 15, 2009 globally.

Dungeon Party is a team-based online game. Players can create characters of a different number of classes and take part in dungeon raids. The objective of these raids is to obtain the treasure and get to the exit of the dungeon. Two teams compete against each other for this objective. Each Dungeon contains numerous traps and dungeon guardians which either aid or hamper a team's efforts.

Gameplay

Critical reception

References

External links
Official web site
Official NA web site The North American and Australian Version published by PlayEnvy

Role-playing video games
Action role-playing video games
Cooperative video games
Massively multiplayer online games
Video games developed in France
Cyanide (company) games
Windows games
Windows-only games
2009 video games
Massively multiplayer online role-playing games